Kevyn is a spelling variant of the name Kevin (occasionally used as feminine).

People named Kevyn

Male

Kevyn Adams (born 1974), retired professional ice hockey center in the National Hockey League
Kevyn Aucoin (1962–2002), American make-up artist and photographer
Kevyn Ista (born 1984), Belgian road bicycle racer
Kevyn Major Howard, Canadian actor best known for his role in Stanley Kubrick's Full Metal Jacket
Kevyn Morrow, American actor, originally from Nebraska

Female

Kevyn Lettau (born 1959), Brazilian jazz vocalist
Kevyn Stafford (born 1964), Canadian sprint canoeist who competed in the early 1990s

Fictional
Kevyn Andreyasn, a fictional character from the webcomic Schlock Mercenary

See also
Kevin
Kevon
KEVY